County Road 854 (CR 854), locally known as Ives Dairy Road, Dan Marino Boulevard, and Honey Hill Drive, is the unsigned designation for an east–west commuter road spanning  across northern Miami-Dade County, which encompasses sections of North 199th Street, North 202nd Street, North 203rd Street, and North 205th Terrace. Its western terminus is an intersection with Red Road/Northwest 57th Avenue (State Road 823, SR 823) near Miami Lakes and Carol City, the eastern terminus is an intersection with Biscayne Boulevard (US Highway 1, US 1) in Aventura, a half block east of an overpass over West Dixie Highway that once served as part of the Dixie Highway and US 1.

Route description
For most of the route, County Road 854 is within two miles south of Miami-Dade County’s boundary with Broward County and adjacent to Snake Creek Canal. A reversible lane setup is in place between SR 817 and US 441 to serve Sun Life Stadium traffic.

The 1.0-mile-long stretch along Sun Life Stadium notwithstanding, CR 854 snakes through suburban residential developments with the occasional shopping center along the way. The former State Road is often used as an alternative to the Homestead Extension of Florida's Turnpike (SR 821) and the Palmetto Expressway (SR 826), when traffic is heavy or blocked on the expressways.

Beyond the western terminus of CR 854, Northwest 202nd Street travels west as a divided road, intersecting with Flamingo Road.  To the west, the road extends an additional  to its end in a residential division next to the Homestead Extension of Florida’s Turnpike.

History
From the late 1950s until 1980, the southern terminus of SR 823 was an intersection of Ludlam Road/Flamingo Road (West 67th Avenue) and North 202nd Street.

Originally, North 199th Street was designated State Road 852 from Red Road (now SR 823) to US 1. In a statewide reallocation of numbers in 1983, the SR 852 signs were moved one mile (1.6 km) northward to County Line Road, and the former SR 852 was relabeled State Road 854, a designation that the route had for two decades. Some commercially available maps still show the road as a State Road despite its reversion to Miami-Dade County maintenance.

Major intersections

References

External links

854
0854
Miami Gardens, Florida